Ruffle or ruffles may refer to:

Ruffle (sewing), a gathered or pleated strip of fabric
Ruffle (software), a Flash Player emulator written in the Rust programming language
Ruffles (potato chips), a brand of potato chips
Ruffles and flourishes, a fanfare for ceremonial music played on drums and bugles
Ruffle Bar, an island in the US state of New York
Raspberry Ruffle, a UK chocolate bar manufactured by Tangerine Confectionery
Jonathan Ruffle, a British writer

See also
 Ruff (disambiguation)